Bathythrix is a genus of ichneumon wasps in the family Ichneumonidae. There are at least 60 described species in Bathythrix.

Species
These 60 species belong to the genus Bathythrix:

 Bathythrix aerea (Gravenhorst, 1829)
 Bathythrix alter (Kerrich, 1942)
 Bathythrix anaulax Townes, 1983
 Bathythrix areolaris (Cushman, 1939)
 Bathythrix argentata (Gravenhorst, 1829)
 Bathythrix carinata (Seyrig, 1952)
 Bathythrix cilifacialis Sheng, 1998
 Bathythrix claviger (Taschenberg, 1865)
 Bathythrix collaris (Thomson, 1896)
 Bathythrix crassa Townes, 1983
 Bathythrix decipiens (Gravenhorst, 1829)
 Bathythrix eurypyga Townes, 1983
 Bathythrix formosa (Desvignes, 1860)
 Bathythrix fragilis (Viereck, 1903)
 Bathythrix gyrinophaga (Cushman, 1930)
 Bathythrix gyrinophagus (Cushman, 1930)
 Bathythrix hirticeps (Cameron, 1909)
 Bathythrix illustris Sawoniewicz, 1980
 Bathythrix ithacae Townes, 1983
 Bathythrix kuwanae Viereck, 1912
 Bathythrix kuwanai Viereck
 Bathythrix lamina (Thomson, 1884)
 Bathythrix latifrons (Cushman, 1939)
 Bathythrix linearis (Gravenhorst, 1829)
 Bathythrix longiceps Townes, 1983
 Bathythrix maculata (Hellen, 1957)
 Bathythrix margaretae Sawoniewicz, 1980
 Bathythrix medialis Townes, 1983
 Bathythrix meteori Howard, 1897
 Bathythrix montana (Schmiedeknecht, 1905)
 Bathythrix narangae (Uchida, 1930)
 Bathythrix nigripalpis Townes, 1983
 Bathythrix pacifica (Cushman, 1920)
 Bathythrix pellucidator (Gravenhorst, 1829)
 Bathythrix peregrina (Cresson, 1868)
 Bathythrix pilosa (Uchida, 1932)
 Bathythrix pimplae Howard, 1897
 Bathythrix pleuralis Sawoniewicz, 1980
 Bathythrix praestans (Seyrig, 1952)
 Bathythrix prominens (Strobl, 1901)
 Bathythrix prothorax Momoi, 1970
 Bathythrix quadrata (Seyrig, 1952)
 Bathythrix rugulosa (Thomson, 1884)
 Bathythrix sericea (Provancher, 1875)
 Bathythrix sericeifrons (Provancher, 1879)
 Bathythrix sparsa Townes, 1983
 Bathythrix spatulator Aubert, 1964
 Bathythrix speculator (Seyrig, 1935)
 Bathythrix spheginus (Gravenhorst, 1829)
 Bathythrix striatus Ashmead
 Bathythrix strigosa (Thomson, 1884)
 Bathythrix subargentea (Cresson, 1864)
 Bathythrix tenuis (Gravenhorst, 1829)
 Bathythrix texana (Ashmead, 1890)
 Bathythrix thomsoni (Kerrich, 1942)
 Bathythrix triangularemaculata (Motschoulsky, 1863)
 Bathythrix triangularis (Cresson, 1868)
 Bathythrix triangulifera (Seyrig, 1952)
 Bathythrix vierecki Townes, 1983
 Bathythrix zonata Townes, 1983

References

External links

 

Parasitic wasps
Articles created by Qbugbot